The 2012–13 Liga Națională season was the 63rd season of the Liga Națională, the highest professional basketball league in Romania.

The first half of the season consisted of 16 teams and 240-game regular season (30 games for each of the 16 teams). The season began on 6 October 2012 and ended on 2 April 2013, just before the Playoffs.

Teams

Regular season

Playoffs
In the 2012–13 season, the first eight teams qualify for the play-off and the last eight teams qualify for the play-out. In the play-offs, the teams play by the "best of five" system in the first two rounds, and by the "best of seven" in the finals. For the third place, CSM Oradea won 2–1 against Gaz Metan Mediaş in the "best of three" system.

External links
Official site of the Romanian basketball federation
Halfcourt.info (Romanian and English)
Numaibaschet.ro (Romanian)
Baschetromania.ro (Romanian)

2016-17
Romanian
Lea